Goller or Göller may refer to:

People 
Andreas Goller (born 1976), Italian sports manager and entrepreneur
Benjamin Goller (born 1999), German footballer
Christian Goller (born 1943), German painter and art restorer currently under investigation regarding paintings attributed to Lucas Cranach the Elder
Gottlieb Göller (1935–2004), German football player and manager
Josef Goller (1868–1947), German designer and stained-glass artist
Karl Heinz Göller (1924–2009), German medievalist
Manuela Goller (born 1971), German former footballer
Sara Goller (born 1983), German beach volleyball player
Thomas Goller (born 1977), German hurdler

Places 
Göller, Sungurlu, Çorum Province, Turkey
Göller, Çayırlı, Erzincan Province, Turkey
Göller, Hınıs, Erzurum Province, Turkey
Göller, Üzümlü, Erzincan Province, Turkey

Other uses 
Brauerei Göller, a German craft brewery